Marsh–Link–Pollock Farm, also known as the Pollock Farm, is a historic home and farm located at Brunswick, Rensselaer County, New York. The farmhouse was built about 1840, and is a two-story, "L"-plan, Greek Revival style timber frame dwelling with a one-story rear ell. The original section was expanded in the 1920s to its present size. Also on the property are the contributing main barn, a small light-frame barn that was used for calves and a concrete block cow barn with a silo (c. 1959).

It was listed on the National Register of Historic Places in 2014.

References

Farms on the National Register of Historic Places in New York (state)
Greek Revival houses in New York (state)
1840 establishments in New York (state)
Houses completed in 1840
Buildings and structures in Rensselaer County, New York
National Register of Historic Places in Rensselaer County, New York